Marc Norman Wanamaker (born October 1, 1947 in Los Angeles) is an historical author, writing on early Los Angeles and Hollywood. He is the founder of Bison Archives, which manages research on the motion picture industry. He helped form and worked with the American Film Institute. He was a co-founder of the Los Angeles International Film Exposition and American Cinematheque.

Bison Archives
Bison Archives was founded by Wanamaker in 1971.  Bison consults for motion picture and television productions, museums, libraries and other media and historical societies and institutions worldwide.  Bison gets its name from “Bison Life Motion Pictures” also called “Bison Films,” which itself was founded in 1909.

Published books

 The Hollywood Reporter - Star Profiles edited by Marc Wanamaker (1984)
 Reel Women : Pioneers of the Cinema, 1896 to the Present by Ally Acker Foreword by Judith Crist; Afterword by Marc Wanamaker (1991)
 Hollywood Haunted: A Ghostly Tour of Filmland by Laurie Jacobson and Marc Wanamaker (1999)
 Destined for Hollywood: The Art of Dan Sayre Grosbeak by Robert Henning Jr., Marc Wanamaker, et al. (2001)
 Hollywood Views of the Past and Present by Marc Wanamaker and George Ross Jezek (2002)
 Early Beverly Hills by Marc Wanamaker (2005)
 Historic Hollywood: An Illustrated History by Robert W. Nudelman and Marc Wanamaker (2005)
 Beverly Hills, 1930-2005 (Images of America) by Marc Wanamaker (2006)
 Early Hollywood by Marc Wanamaker and Robert W Nudelman (2007)
 Theatres in Los Angeles (Images of America: California) by Suzanne Tarbell Cooper, Amy Ronnebeck Hall, Marc Wanamaker, et al. (2008)
 Beverly Hills, 1930-2005 (Postcards of America: California) by Marc Wanamaker (2008)
 Hollywood, 1940-2008 by Marc Wanamaker (2009)
 Early Warner Bros. Studios by E.J. Stephens and Marc Wanamaker (2010)
 Westwood by Marc Wanamaker (2010)
 Location Filming in Los Angeles by Karie Bible, Marc Wanamaker, et al. (2010)
 San Fernando Valley (Images of America) by Marc Wanamaker (2011)
 Movie Studios of Culver City by Lugo Cerra, Marc Wanamaker, et al. (2011)
 Malibu (Images of America) by Ben Marcus and Marc Wanamaker (2011)
 San Fernando Valley (Postcards of America) by Marc Wanamaker (2011)
 Griffith Park (Images of America) by E.J. Stephens and Marc Wanamaker (2011)
 Early Paramount Studios by E J Stephens, Michael Christaldi, et al. (2013)
 Warner Bros.: Hollywood's Ultimate Backlot by Steven Bingen, Doris Day, Mark Wanamaker, et al. (2014)
 Early Poverty Row Studios (Images of America) by E.J. Stephens and Marc Wanamaker (2014)
 Max Factor and Hollywood: A Glamorous History by Erika Thomas, Marc Wanamaker, et al. (2016)
 Paramount Studios: 1940-2000 by Marc Wanamaker, Michael Christaldi, et al. (2016)
 Hollywood's Lost Backlot: 40 Acres of Glamour and Mystery by Steven Bingen with Marc Wanamaker (2018)

Personal life
Wanamaker is a native of Los Angeles, California.  He is the nephew of actor Sam Wanamaker and cousin of actress Zoë Wanamaker.

References

External links
 Bison Archives

1947 births
20th-century American historians
21st-century American historians
21st-century American male writers
American film historians
American male non-fiction writers
American people of Ukrainian-Jewish descent
American people of Russian descent
Historians of California
Jewish American writers
Living people
Oral historians
People from Beverly Hills, California
Writers from California
Historians from California
21st-century American Jews